This article deals with the grammar of the Komi language of the northeastern European part of Russia (the article "Komi language" discusses the language in general and contains a quick overview of the language.)

Pronouns
Komi pronouns are inflected much in the same way that nouns are. However, personal pronouns are usually only inflected in the grammatical cases and cannot be inflected in the locative cases.

Personal pronouns
Komi personal pronouns inflect in the grammatical cases and the approximative case. Personal pronouns in the nominative case are listed in the following table:

Nominals
As with other languages in the Uralic family, Komi does not encode grammatical gender. Nouns and personal pronouns make no gender distinction; сійӧ/sijö  means both 'he' and 'she', depending on the referent.

Cases
Komi has seventeen noun cases: nine core grammatical cases and eight locative cases. The locative cases are usually only used with inanimate references with the exception of the elative, terminative, approximative and egressive cases. There is no difference in the meaning of the translative and prolative cases.

Stem extension

Preceding suffixes that start with a vowel, nouns may use an extended stem.

Nouns ending in в often change this consonant to л, e.g. ныв ("girl") → нылыс ("his/her girl").

Some nouns ending in дз, дь and ль undergo gemination, e.g.:

видз ("lawn") → виддзыд ("your lawn");
додь ("sled") → доддьыс ("his sled");
куль ("demon") → кулльысь ("from a demon").

Another group of nouns undergoes epenthesis, e.g.:

пон ("dog") → понйыс ("his/her dog");
ун ("dream") → унмӧн ("by means of a dream");
ош ("bear") → ошкысь ("from a bear");
гӧп ("puddle") → гӧптын ("in a puddle");
кыв ("language") → кывйын ("his/her language").

Personal pronouns

The declension of personal pronouns is quite systematic as well:

Plural

There are two types of nominal plurals in Komi. One is the plural for nouns -яс (with the exception of -ян in пиян, "the sons / boys" and -ана/-яна in words ending on -анин/-янин, e.g. зыряна, "Zyrians") and the other is the plural for adjectives -ӧсь.

Nominal plural
In attributive plural phrases, the noun is always in plural, while the adjective is not required to be in the plural:  

The plural marker always comes before other endings (i.e. cases and possessive suffixes) in the morphological structure of plural nominal. 

Since -яс, -ян and -яна start with a soft vowel, they may be preceded by either a hard sign (ъ) or a soft sign (ь), depending on the preceding letter:

Predicative plural
As in Hungarian, if the subject is plural, the adjective is always plural when it functions as the sentence's predicative:

Possessive suffixes

Nominal possessive suffixes
Komi possessive suffixes are added to the end of nouns either before or after a case ending. The possessive suffixes vary in the nominative and accusative cases and with case endings.

Accusative possessive suffixes
Accusative possessive suffixes are shown in the following table. Note that the possessive of the first person in the accusative matches the simple accusative.

Verbs
Komi infinitives are marked with -ны. as in мунны, 'to go'. Some infinitives have a so called connecting vowel ы which is dropped in the verbal stem when affixing, for example, a personal ending such as in the verb велӧдчыны ‘to study’ → велӧдча 'I study'. 

There is one phoneme which undergoes consonant gradation when adding a suffix beginning with a vowel. This change is в → л as in овны ‘to live’ → олан ‘you live’. Another exception is the verb локны, which has an epenthetic [t] added before a suffix beginning with a vowel, e.g. локтан ‘you come’.

The indicative mood has four tenses: present, future and two past tenses. In addition, there are four past tense structures which include auxiliary verbs. Verbs are negated by use of an auxiliary negative verb that conjugates with personal endings. Separate personal pronouns are not required in verb phrases.

Present tense
The verbal personal markers in the Komi present tense are:

The negative indicative present is formed by the auxiliary о- negative verb and the verbal stem in the first person and with -ӧй in the first and second person plural and -ны in the third person plural.

The negative verb conjugates with the ending -г in first person, -н in the second person and -з in the third person. The first and second person plural is marked with -ӧ.

Future tense
The affirmative and negative future tense in Komi is basically the same as in the present with the exception of the third person in the affirmative, ending in -ас (singular) and -асны (plural):

Past tense
The conventionally used designations preterite and perfect are used with denotations which are divergent from their usual meanings in the grammar of other languages.

Preterite I
The first preterite can be compared with the simple past in English. Preterite I is marked with і/и.

The negative preterite I is formed by the auxiliary э- negative verb with the same personal endings as in present tense. The main verb is the same as in the present tense

Preterite II
The second preterite is a past tense with an evidentiality distinction. It can be compared to the English perfect in which the speaker did not personally observe the past event. The preterite II is marked with -ӧм-, which is historically related to the third infinitive in Finnish. 

The negative preterite II is formed by including the auxiliary copular negative verb абу 'is not', e.g. абу уджалӧма (I have evidently not worked), абу уджалӧмыд (you have evidently not worked) etc.

Auxiliary past tenses
There are four past tenses in Komi which use a preterite form of the main verb and a preterite form of the auxiliary verb 'to be'.

Preterite III
The Komi preterite III makes use of the main verb in the present tense and the auxiliary вӧлі, 'was' in third person singular, in simple past. The pluperfect I tense expresses a continuation of action that has happened in the (distant) past.  

The negative preterite III is formed by including the auxiliary copular verb вӧлі  ‘was' with the main verb in the present negative.

Preterite IV
The Komi preterite IV (pluperfect) makes use of the main verb in the preterite II form and the auxiliary вӧлі, 'was' in third person singular, in simple past. The preterite IV tense expresses an evidently completed action that has happened in the (distant) past.  

The negative preterite IV is formed by including the auxiliary copular negative verb абу 'is not', e.g. вӧлі абу уджалӧма (I have evidently not worked), вӧлі абу уджалӧмыд (you have evidently not worked) etc.

Preterite V
The Komi preterite V makes use of the main verb in the present form and the auxiliary вӧлӧм, 'apparently was' in third person singular, preterite II. The preterite V tense expresses an evidently continuous action that has happened in the (distant) past.  

The negative preterite V is formed by including the auxiliary copular verb вӧлӧм 'evidently  was' with the main verb in the present negative.

Preterite VI
The Komi preterite VI makes use of the main verb in the preterite II form and the auxiliary вӧлӧм, 'apparently was' in third person singular, preterite II. The preterite VI tense expresses an evidently completed action that has happened in the (distant) past.  

The negative preterite VI is formed by including the auxiliary copular negative verb абу 'is not', e.g. вӧлӧм абу уджалӧма (I had evidently not worked), вӧлӧм абу уджалӧмыд (you had evidently not worked) etc.

Participles
Komi verbs have past and present participles. These participles can also be passive or active. In addition to affirmative participles, Komi also has a caritive participle.

The present participle is -ысь. It is a participle which expresses continuous action and is always active. It is affixed to the stems of the verb.

In addition to functioning as regular attributive participle, the present participle also functions as a nominalizing derivational suffix.

The participle -ан/-ана denotes continuous action and can be active as in сетан ки ‘a giving hand’. It can also be passive, formed from a transitive verb with the noun acting as the object as in лыддян небӧг, 'a book being read'. The agent in the phrase is in the instrumental case: Тайӧ мамӧй вуран дӧрӧм, ’This is a shirt sewn by mother’.

The past participle is -ӧм. It is an attributive participle which expresses completed action. It can be active with the head noun as agent велӧдчӧм морт 'a learned person', passive formed from a transitive verbs велӧдчӧм урок 'a lesson that was learned', the noun acting as the object as in гижӧм небӧг 'a book that was written'. The agent in the phrase is in the instrumental case: Иван Куратовӧн гижӧм небӧг, 'A book written by Ivan Kuratov'.

The caritive participle is -тӧм.

Sources

References

Komi language
Uralic grammars
Permic languages